Anatololacerta pelasgiana is a species of lizard found in Turkey and Greece.

References

Anatololacerta
Reptiles described in 1959
Taxa named by Robert Mertens